Ashok Kumar Kansal is an Indian politician and a member of the 15th Legislative Assembly of Uttar Pradesh of India. He represented the Muzaffarnagar constituency of Uttar Pradesh and is a member of the Bharatiya Janata Party.

References

1958 births
Living people
People from Muzaffargarh District
Bharatiya Jana Sangh politicians